Paul Grimes may refer to:

 Paul Grimes (criminal) (born 1950), English former gangster
 Paul Grimes (public servant), Australian public servant